The 1932 United States presidential election in Florida was held on November 8, 1932, as part of the concurrent United States presidential election held in all 48 contemporary states. Florida voters chose seven electors, or representatives to the Electoral College, who voted for president and vice president.

Background
Ever since the disfranchisement of blacks at the beginning of the 1890s, Florida had been a one-party state ruled by the Democratic Party. The disfranchisement of blacks and poor whites by poll taxes in 1889 had left the Republican Party – between 1872 and 1888 dependent upon black votes – virtually extinct.

With the single exception of William Howard Taft's win in Calhoun County in 1908 the Democratic Party won every county in Florida in every presidential election from 1892 until 1916. Only twice – and never for more than one term – did any Republican serve in either house of the state legislature between 1896 and 1928. Despite this Democratic dominance and the restrictions on the franchise of the poorer classes due to the poll tax, significant socialist movements were to develop and persist in Tampa and to a lesser extent over other parts of the state, especially against the powerful Ku Klux Klan. There was also a powerful Prohibitionist movements in older North Florida, which saw the Prohibition Party even win the governorship for one term under the notorious anti-Catholic minister Sidney J. Catts.

The 1920, aided by a growing "Presidential Republican" vote from migrants from the northern states in southern Florida, saw the GOP increase its vote totals above those from traditional Unionists (which Florida entirely lacked) in Texas, Arkansas, Alabama or Georgia. In 1928, Florida, especially the western Panhandle pineywoods, turned dramatically away from the Democratic Party due to the nomination of Catholic Al Smith, with the result that Herbert Hoover became the first Republican to win a statewide election since the end of Reconstruction.

Vote
The influence of the Great Depression completely reversed the Republican trend in Florida Presidential elections of the 1920s. Absent the religious issue that controlled the 1928 election, Florida resumed typical "Solid South" voting behaviour, although the urban Republican trend of the 1920s was not wholly reversed, as seen in Hoover gaining over forty percent of the ballots in the growing urban counties of Orange (Orlando) and Pinellas (St. Petersburg). Franklin D. Roosevelt won against Herbert Hoover by 137,137 votes or by 49.64% and received all 7 of the electoral votes.

Results

Results by county

Notes

References 

1932
Florida
1932 Florida elections